Alexander and Wall v Standard Telephones & Cables Ltd (No 2) [1991] IRLR 287 is a UK labour law case on when a collective agreement is incorporated into an employment contract.

Facts
The workplace collective agreement of Standard Telephones & Cables Ltd in paragraph 6.1 worked on a "last in, first out" criteria for redundancy, ‘selection within each skill group will be made on the basis of service within the group’. Paragraph 6.2 said the ‘mutual objective will be to ensure that a balance of skills within the department is preserved…’ Standard Telephones instead made people redundant on the basis of skills needed. Mr Alexander and Ward both had informal contracts of employment. They were older and claiming they should not have been made compulsorily redundant. Because there was no evidence of express incorporation, the court asked whether it could be incorporated through implication.

Judgment
Hobhouse J held that the collective agreement would not be incorporated. He said that whether the collective agreement was incorporated was a matter of construction. Here the agreement designated itself as a ‘procedure’ agreement. ‘It is undoubtedly primarily a policy document applicable to the relationship between the unions and the company. It is also specifically concerned with procedure.’ Another clause referring to redeployment depended on another company division accepting the worker. This was not,

See also

Contract of employment in English law
UK labour law
EU labour law
US labor law
German labour law

Notes

References

United Kingdom labour case law
High Court of Justice cases
1991 in case law
1991 in British law
United Kingdom employment contract case law